The Tony Blair Institute (TBI), commonly known by its trade name the Tony Blair Institute for Global Change, is a non-profit organisation set up by former UK Prime Minister Tony Blair to provide advice to governments and "to help political leaders build open, inclusive and prosperous societies in an increasingly interconnected world". It claims to help countries, their people and their governments address some of the most difficult challenges in the world today. Bringing together the various organisations Blair set up after leaving office – The Tony Blair Governance Initiative and the Tony Blair Faith Foundation – as well as his work on the Middle East peace process, establishing a new area of work: Renewing the Centre. Blair’s intention was to expand the activity of these organisations, re-orientating the mission to reflect the overlap between extremism, governance, the Middle East and the policies needed to fight populism in the West.

Agenda 
The organisation is not a political party, but it is heavily influenced by the ideology and personal style of Tony Blair.

Blair launched the Institute as a “new policy platform to refill the wide open space in the middle of politics” aimed at combating a “frightening authoritarian populism” that he says is undermining the west’s belief in democracy. He has said the organisation will focus on re-energising the centre ground, fighting religious extremism, African governance and Middle East policy.

In an interview with The Guardian, the former prime minister said his Institute for Global Change is more than a think tank since it would aim to arm front-rank politicians with strategies and policies to rebuild the centre, and combat populism caused by a cultural and economic revolt against the effects of globalisation. In that interview on 17 March 2017 Blair said:
 Labour’s "essential duty" was that the party should be opposed to Brexit at any cost, keeping open an option that allows the British people to think again if they dislike the deal secured (by) Conservative Prime Minister Theresa May. 
 It was not his intention to create a movement like the En Marche! vehicle created by Emmanuel Macron in France, but instead to help create a set of policies to address voters’ anxieties caused by globalisation, including stagnating incomes and migration.

Policy areas 
The Tony Blair Institute believes that extremism, governance, the Middle East and the fight against populism are all interconnected. For example, they say that countries will not develop where extremism flourishes. Without peace in the Middle East, grievances will continue to fester, and conflict will spill-over to other countries. Those seeking refuge have also been used by populists to whip up anger in the West – and, crucially, they say that the centre-ground has to deal with these issues and renew a politics of hope and optimism, rejecting fear and pessimism.

Renewing the Centre Ground 
Headed by German-American political scientist Yascha Mounk, a lecturer at Harvard, they work to revitalise the centre ground of politics and equip today’s leaders to combat the rise of false populism. Focusing on the big policy challenges that globalisation presents, they aim to combat populism and revitalise the centre ground through a corpus of new policy thinking.

Co-existence 
They work to promote co-existence and counter extremism by tackling the ideology behind violence, not just the violence itself, and focusing on responses to extremism that first seek to understand the underlying ideology then addressing it by disrupting its spread, reducing its appeal, and building resilience to its messaging.

Middle East  
They engage with Israeli and Palestinian leaders and key officials, influential regional actors, diplomatic missions and multinational institutions, to inform and guide thinking and decision-making. Developing and advocating for practical recommendations on the peace process and to improve the economic, political and humanitarian realities on the ground in the West Bank and Gaza. The team also focuses on efforts aimed at allowing for renewed and credible discussions between the Palestinian and Israeli governments, including on pressing issues related to the economic and fiscal stability of the Palestinian Authority, as well as working with the sides on ideas to boost the Palestinian economy.

The Tony Blair Institute warned of growing Iranian threat. According to The Tony Blair Institute: "The totalitarian and divisive worldview born from the 1979 Iranian Revolution… has been a driving force of instability and violence for years. Unless Western leaders can learn the lessons from the 1979 revolution, the threat Iran poses will continue to grow."

Governance 
Their governance work focuses on working with governments and leaders of fragile, developing and emerging states to enhance their effectiveness. They help governments and leaders make their vision for development a reality. Providing analysis, commentary and lessons from their work with governments in fragile, developing and emerging states.

The Tony Blair Institute has projects in 14 African countries, whose combined population exceeds 460 million. Their governance work is primarily programmatic. Tony Blair provides advice to African leaders with Tony Blair Institute advisers working in governments, helping them implement their own visions for development.

Funding 
Blair gave the reserves of his former business to provide the seed funding for his new Institute. On 21 July 2018, it was reported by the Telegraph that Blair had signed a deal worth £9,000,000 with Saudi Arabia. The article quotes a spokesperson saying while the Institute was under no duty to disclose donors or donations they confirmed receiving a donation from Media Investment Ltd, a subsidiary of the Saudi Research and Marketing Group registered in Guernsey, to fund their work for modernisation and reform working for a regional solution to the peace process as well as on governance in Africa and promoting religious co-existence. The Tony Blair Institute confirmed that it has received donations from the U.S. State Department and Saudi Arabia.

Legacy organisations 
On 1 December 2016 Blair announced that ‘The Africa Governance Initiative’; ‘The Tony Blair Faith Foundation’; and his ‘Initiative for the Middle East’ would all become part of the Tony Blair Institute saying: “Over the past nine years we have built a family of organisations which together employ nearly 200 people; have worked in over 30 countries; and have produced some real and lasting achievements. I am very proud of the commitment and impact of the people I have had the privilege to work with.”

References

External links

Tony Blair
Foundations based in the United Kingdom
2016 establishments in the United Kingdom
Organizations established in 2016
Brexit–related advocacy groups in the United Kingdom
Political and economic think tanks based in the United Kingdom
Think tanks based in the United Kingdom